Cora Amalia Castilla Madrid (27 January 1961 in Chetumal, Quintana Roo) is a Mexican politician and activist.  A member of the Partido Revolucionario Institucional (PRI), she was municipal president of the municipality of Othón P. Blanco from 2005 to 2008, President of the PRI in Quintana Roo from 2009 to 2011, and has been Secretary of Culture of the State Government of Quintana Roo and Deputy in the Congress of Quintana Roo twice.

References

Living people
Institutional Revolutionary Party politicians
Mexican women's rights activists
Municipal presidents in Quintana Roo
Universidad de las Américas Puebla alumni
Members of the Congress of Quintana Roo
20th-century Mexican politicians
20th-century Mexican women politicians
21st-century Mexican politicians
21st-century Mexican women politicians
Politicians from Quintana Roo
People from Chetumal, Quintana Roo
Year of birth missing (living people)